Latin Pop Albums is a record chart published in Billboard magazine that features Latin music sales information. The Latin Pop Chart was the first of the Latin charts along with, Regional Mexican Albums and Tropical Albums, to be released from Billboard. The data is compiled by Nielsen SoundScan from a sample that includes music stores, music departments at electronics and department stores, Internet sales (both physical and digital) and verifiable sales from concert venues in the United States. The data for this chart was published every two weeks, unlike most Billboard charts.

During the 1980s, there were 19 number-one albums in this chart, which was first published on June 29, 1985. The first album to peak at number one in the first year of publication was Reflexiones, by Mexican singer José José. The album received a Grammy Award nomination for Grammy Award for Best Latin Pop Album and received a platinum certification in Mexico for sales of 250,000 units, Reflexiones spent 8 weeks at number one in 1985. Three other albums by José José: Promesas, Siempre Contigo, and Soy Así also reached number-one on the chart. Un hombre solo by Spanish singer Julio Iglesias holds the record for having the most consecutive weeks at number-one. It won the Grammy Award for Best Latin Pop Album in 1988, defeating albums from veteran pop such as singers José José, Danny Rivera, Yolandita Monge, and Emmanuel; the latter had two albums which peaked at number one in March 1987 with his albums Solo and Entre Lunas in May 1988. In addition, a compilation album related to the artist reached number-one in 1986.

Primitive Love by the Miami Sound Machine peaked number-one on October 4, 1986, for six weeks and twenty-three on the Billboard 200. The eponymous album by Roberto Carlos, released in 1988, spent two weeks at the top of the chart and won the Grammy Award for Best Latin Pop Album. One compilation album related to Spanish singer-songwriter Camilo Sesto spent six non-consecutive weeks as number-one . Another performer of Spanish descent, Isabel Pantoja, reached number-one with her album, Desde Andalucía. The album spent 24 weeks on top making it the longest consecutive number-one album on the chart by a female artist. Tierra de nadie by Ana Gabriel was her first number-one album and the last album to chart in the 1980s.

Number-one albums
Key
 – Best-selling Latin pop album of the year

See also 
List of number-one Billboard Regional Mexican Albums from the 1980s
List of number-one Billboard Tropical Albums from the 1980s

References
General

 For information about each week of this chart, follow this link; select a date to view the top albums for that particular week}}
Week of August 23, 1986: 
Week of September 6, 1986: 
Week of September 20, 1986: 
Week of October 4, 1986: 
Week of October 18, 1986: 
Week of November 1, 1986: 

Specific

Pop 1980s

United States Latin Pop Albums
1980s in Latin music